Brock Coyle (born October 12, 1990) is a former American football linebacker. He played college football at Montana and signed with the Seattle Seahawks as an undrafted free agent in 2014.

College career
Coyle played college football at the University of Montana in Missoula. As a true freshman in 2009, he collected thirty tackles and two interceptions as a linebacker, then  redshirted in 2010 following off-season surgery. In 2011, he played in all fourteen games for the Grizzlies, and was the team's sixteenth leading tackler despite not starting a single game. In 2012, Coyle enjoyed a breakout season when he started eleven games and tallied 107 tackles. His average of 9.73 tackles a game ranked him 28th in the nation, and he was an honorable mention All-Big Sky Conference selection.

As a fifth-year senior in 2013, Coyle had his finest college season with the Grizzlies while starting at inside linebacker, leading the team with 125 total tackles, which put him among the nation's leaders. He forced four fumbles and intercepted two passes, giving him five interceptions for his college football career, and was a second-team All-Big Sky  selection.

While at Montana, Coyle was teammates with future NFL linebacker Jordan Tripp and cornerback Trumaine Johnson.

Professional career

Seattle Seahawks
Although Coyle went undrafted in the 2014 NFL Draft, he was signed to a professional contract by the Seattle Seahawks just minutes after the draft's completion. Seahawks coaches praised Coyle for his productive play during the NFL preseason while he filled in for injured middle linebacker Bobby Wagner. Coyle started his first NFL regular season game at middle linebacker for the Seattle Seahawks on Sunday November 2, 2014 while playing against the Oakland Raiders.

Coyle had a successful career with the Seahawks, mostly as a core special teamer, while also starting 5 games. Coyle tallied 33 tackles and 1.0 sack in three years. One of Coyle's best games was when he started at Strongside linebacker against the Buffalo Bills. On Monday Night Football, Coyle had his first career sack, along with 8 tackles on the night. When Coyle was given time, Carroll was generally pleased with his play.

San Francisco 49ers
On March 10, 2017, Coyle signed a one-year contract with the San Francisco 49ers.

On March 14, 2018, Coyle signed a three-year contract extension with the 49ers. He was placed on injured reserve on September 12, 2018 after suffering a concussion in Week 1.

On March 14, 2019, Coyle was released by the 49ers, and subsequently announced his retirement from the NFL, stating that a broken bone in his back prevented him from returning.

References

External links
Seattle Seahawks: Brock Coyle
University of Montana Athletics: Brock Coyle
Official Website: Brock Coyle

Living people
1990 births
American football linebackers
Players of American football from Montana
Sportspeople from Bozeman, Montana
Montana Grizzlies football players
Seattle Seahawks players
San Francisco 49ers players